Marsh Marigold Lake is a lake on Vancouver Island that is west  of Buttle Lake.

See also
List of lakes of British Columbia

References

Alberni Valley
Lakes of Vancouver Island
Nootka Land District